Dan Ruby (born December 1, 1964) is an American politician. He is a member of the North Dakota House of Representatives from the 38th District, serving since 2000. He is a member of the Republican party.

References

Living people
1964 births
Republican Party members of the North Dakota House of Representatives
People from Minot, North Dakota
21st-century American politicians